Baldellia is a genus of aquatic plants commonly known as lesser water-plantains. It includes three species found across much of Europe and the Mediterranean from Ireland and the Canary Islands to Turkey and Estonia. The genus is named in honor of the Italian nobleman Bartolomea Bartoloni-Baldelli. Baldellia is very closely related to Echinodorus.

Description
Leaves aerial, elliptical to lanceolate or linear-lanceolate. Flowers hermaphrodite, in 1 - 3 whorls in umbels or racemes, or long-pedunculate in leaf-axils. Stamens 6. Carpels numerous, spirally arranged in a globose head, free, each with 1 ovule; styles apical. Fruitlets achenial, longitudinally 5-ribbed (3 dorsal ribs and 2 closely approximated ventral ribs), with a short, apical beak. 2n=16.

Variable in form according to ecological conditions.

Species
Three species are recognized:

 Baldellia alpestris (Cosson) Vasc. - northwestern Spain and northern Portugal
 Baldellia ranunculoides (L.) Parl.
Baldellia ranunculoides var ranunculoides  - from the Azores and Ireland to Turkey and Estonia
Baldellia ranunculoides var. tangerina (Pau) J.Rocha - Spain, Portugal, Morocco
 Baldellia repens (Lam.) Ooststr
Baldellia repens subsp. baetica Talavera & Casimiro-Soriguer - southwestern Spain
Baldellia repens subsp. cavanillesii (Molina Abril, A.Galán, J.M.Pizarro & Sard.Rosc.) Talavera - Spain, Portugal, France, Belgium, Netherlands
Baldellia repens subsp. repens - Canaries, Spain, Portugal, Algeria

References

Alismataceae
Alismataceae genera
Freshwater plants